Dasht-e Lar (also Romanized as Dasht-e Lār) is a village in Hangam Rural District, in the Central District of Qir and Karzin County, Fars Province, Iran. At the 2006 census, its population was 97, in 17 families.

References 

Populated places in Qir and Karzin County